Phytobiini is a tribe of minute seed weevils in the beetle family Curculionidae. There are about 7 genera and 18 described species in Phytobiini.

Genera
These nine genera belong to the tribe Phytobiini:
 Eubrychius
 Euhrychiopsis Dietz, 1896 i g b
 Marmaropus
 Neophytobius Wagner, 1936 i c g b
 Parenthis Dietz, 1896 i g b
 Pelenomus C.G.Thomson, 1859 c g b
 Phytobius Schönherr, 1833 i c g b
 Rhinoncomimus Wagner, 1940 c g b
 Rhinoncus Schönherr, 1825 i c g b
Data sources: i = ITIS, c = Catalogue of Life, g = GBIF, b = Bugguide.net

References

 Gistel, J. 1848: Faunula monacensis cantharologica. (Fortsetzung). Isis von Oken, 1848(7): second to fourth unnumbered pages in the Section Umschlag (front covers).
 Colonnelli, E. 1980: Notes on Phytobiini, with a key to the New World genera (Coleoptera: Curculionidae: Ceutorhynchinae). Coleopterists bulletin, 34(3): 281–284.

External links 

 
 
 bugguide.net

Baridinae